Battle Riot is an annual professional wrestling event produced by Major League Wrestling (MLW). The inaugural event took place on July 19, 2018.

The event is named after the Battle Riot match, a multi-competitor match type in which wrestlers are eliminated until one is left and declared winner. The match begins with two participants in the ring. Another fighter then enters every minute until 40 wrestlers have joined the match. Competitors are eliminated by either pin, submission, or going over the top rope and having both feet touch the venue floor. The declared winner of the Battle Riot match receives a future title shot for the MLW World Heavyweight Championship.

The first two events were aired as special episodes of MLW's weekly series, MLW Fusion, on BeIN Sports USA. Since Battle Riot III in 2021, the event has been presented as a standalone special - equivalent to a pay-per-view.

Dates, venues and winners

Championship match for winner
 – Championship victory
 – Championship match loss

External links
 Major League Wrestling official website

 
Professional wrestling battle royales
Major League Wrestling shows